Oren Lavaughn Nichols (May 7, 1918 – December 25, 2006) was an American professional basketball player. He played for the Indianapolis Kautskys in the National Basketball League.

References

1918 births
2006 deaths
American men's basketball players
Basketball players from Indiana
Guards (basketball)
Indianapolis Kautskys players